Wojtala is a Polish surname. Notable people with the surname include:

 Paweł Wojtala (born 1972), Polish footballer
 Sabina Wojtala (born 1981), Polish figure skater

See also
 

Polish-language surnames